Stone, Brick, Glass, Wood, Wire (Graphic Scores 1986–96) is a double live album by English guitarist, composer and improvisor Fred Frith. It comprises a series of graphic scores Frith composed in 1992 "for any number of players". It was performed live by Frith, Ikue Mori, Zeena Parkins and the International Occasional Ensemble at five concerts in Canada (October 1992), Italy (May 1992), Belgium (May 1994), Netherlands (October 1994) and Germany (October 1995). Frith also conducted and directed the performances.

Background
The graphic scores used for the performances were a set of photographs taken by Frith of a variety of inanimate objects, including stone pavings, brick walls, windows, stacks of logs and high-tension wires. Each photograph had instructions explaining to the musicians how to interpret the patterns in the image. For example, "Skylight IV" was a photograph of skylights in a large building and was annotated as follows:

Frith chose the pictures for the patterns and repetitions they contained. Breaks in the patterns (for example, paint smudges, leaves on sand) guided soloists and defined instrumental groupings. Generally time was read from left to right and pitch vertically. Under the direction of Frith, with wide latitude given to each individual musician's interpretation of the proceedings, the resulting music was a form of structured improvisation. Dave Lynch at AllMusic wrote: "At its best, structured improvisation can provide a guiding context that enhances, rather than limits, the impact of the improvisations themselves. Such is the case with Stone, Brick, Glass, Wood, Wire, some of the best photographs you ever heard."

Track listing
All tracks composed by Fred Frith.

Venues
Disc 1, tracks 1-2 recorded live at the Time Festival, Ghent, Belgium, May 1994
Disc 1, tracks 3-5 recorded live at the 10th Festival International de Musique Actuelle de Victoriaville, Victoriaville, Quebec, Canada, October 1992 
Disc 1, tracks 6-8 recorded live at the Angelica Festival Internazionale di Musica, Bologna, Italy, May 1992
Disc 1, tracks 9-12 recorded live at the Jazz Marathon, Groningen, the Netherlands, October 1994
Disc 2, tracks 1-5 recorded live at the Kulturzentrum Dieselstrasse, Esslingen, Germany, October 1995

Personnel
Fred Frith – violin, guitar, direction
Ikue Mori (all but disc 1, tracks 6-8) – drum computers
Zeena Parkins (all but disc 1, tracks 6-8) – harp, electric harp, accordion
Olivia Bignardi (disc 1, tracks 6-8) – clarinet, bass clarinet
Daniela Cattivelli (disc 1, tracks 6-8) – alto saxophone
Jean Derome (disc 1, tracks 3-5) – alto saxophone, baritone saxophone, flutes
Hans Koch (disc 2, tracks 1-5) – saxophones, clarinets
Roberto Paci Dalo (disc 1, tracks 6-8) – clarinet, bass clarinet
Mariette Rouppe van der Voort (disc 1, tracks 9-12; disc 2, tracks 1-5) – soprano saxophone, flute, alto flute
Co Streiff (disc 1, tracks 9-12; disc 2, tracks 1-5) – tenor saxophone, baritone saxophone
Raymund van Santen (disc 1, tracks 1-2,9-12) – alto saxophone
Peter Vermeersch (disc 1, tracks 1-2) – tenor saxophone, clarinet
Takashi Yamane (disc 1, tracks 1-2) – bass clarinet
Stefano Zorzanello (disc 1, tracks 6-8) – soprano saxophone, flute
Lesli Dalaba (disc 1, tracks 3-5) – trumpet
Ferdinando d'Andria (disc 1, tracks 6-8) – trumpet, violin
Bart Maris (disc 1, tracks 1-2,9-12; disc 2, tracks 1-5) – trumpet
Salvatore Panu (disc 1, tracks 6-8) – trombone
Giorgio Simbola (disc 1, tracks 6-8) – bombardino
Paolo Angeli (disc 1, tracks 6-8) – guitar
Claudio Lanteri (disc 1, tracks 6-8) – guitar
René Lussier (disc 1, tracks 1-5) – guitar, daxophone
Jean-Marc Montera (disc 1, tracks 9-12) – guitar
Silvia Fanti (disc 1, tracks 6-8) – accordion
Guy Klucevsek (disc 1, tracks 3-5) – accordion
Filomena Forleo (disc 1, tracks 6-8) – piano
Myra Melford (disc 1, tracks 3-5) – piano
Daan van der Walle (disc 1, tracks 1-2,9-12) – piano
Christine Wodraszka (disc 2, tracks 1-5) – piano
Pierangelo Galantino (disc 1, tracks 6-8) – violin, double bass
Lelio Giannetto (disc 1, tracks 6-8) – double bass
Han Bennink (disc 1, tracks 1-5) – drums
Chris Cutler (disc 1, tracks 9-12) – drums
Ahmed Compaore (disc 2, tracks 1-5) – drums
Andrea Martignoni (disc 1, tracks 6-8; disc 2, tracks 1-5) – percussion
Mario Martignoni (disc 1, tracks 6-8) – percussion
Pino Urso (disc 1, tracks 6-8) – percussion
Nicola Zonca (disc 1, tracks 6-8) – marimba
Marco Dalpane (disc 1, tracks 6-8) – keyboards
Fred Giuliani (disc 1, tracks 9-12) – samples
Margareth Kammerer (disc 1, tracks 6-8) – voice
Didier Roth (disc 1, tracks 1-5) – bricolage
Massimo Simonini (disc 1, tracks 6-8) – records, CDs, Casio SK1

References

External links
Stone, Brick, Glass, Wood, Wire at the International Festival Musique Actuelle, Victoriaville 1992.
Stone, Brick, Glass, Wood, Wire presentation Exhibition of photographs, scores and clips from performances in Ghent and Victoriaville.

1999 live albums
Albums produced by Fred Frith
Fred Frith live albums
Live free improvisation albums